Svend 'Viking' Karlsen (born 6 October 1967) is a Norwegian former strongman, powerlifter, and IFBB professional bodybuilder. Being a winner of the World's Strongest Man, the Europe's Strongest Man, the World Muscle Power Classic and 3 times runner up at the Arnold Strongman Classic, he is regarded as one of the best strongmen in history. He is also well known for shouting his catch phrase "Viking Power!" during competitions.

Powerlifting and bodybuilding
Karlsen started out as a powerlifter in 1986, winning a number of titles and setting 30 Norwegian records, 3 European records, and 1 world record. Soon after, Karlsen began pursuing a career in bodybuilding. He traveled on the road doing posing exhibitions with some bodybuilding friends to help pay the bills. Karlsen won the Mr. Norway title, and took second place at the World Games. This victory earned him his IFBB pro card and he could now compete as a professional. Karlsen moved to California to focus on his bodybuilding career, and his first pro show was the IFBB Night of Champions. Karlsen suffered a severe muscle tear that forced him to retire from bodybuilding, and in 1996 he quickly moved on to strongman competitions.

Strongman career
Karlsen competed in one of the 1996 World's Strongest Man qualifying heats and narrowly missed qualifying for the finals. In the 1997 World's Strongest Man contest, Karlsen qualified for his first of 7 consecutive finals from 1997, 1999-2004 (did not compete in 1998). After finishing second in the Husafel Stone carry, Karlsen was leading the finals on points, but during the warm-up for the squat event, he tore his hamstring and had to withdraw from the rest of the contest. Karlsen returned in 1999, finishing in third place, and finished in second place in 2000 behind eventual winner Janne Virtanen. Karlsen finally became victorious at the 2001 World's Strongest Man competition in Victoria Falls, Zambia.

Some of Karlsen's other notable strongman titles include Europe's Strongest Man 2001, 3 time runner-up at the Arnold Strongman Classic 2002-04, World Muscle Power Championships 2001 winner, and 3 time Norway's Strongest Man in 2003, 2005 and 2006. Karlsen was the second athlete inducted into the World's Strongest Man Hall of Fame in 2010 as voted by the fans. He has a larger than life personality and, similar to his Scandinavian strongman predecessor Jón Páll Sigmarsson, is known for his catchphrase "Viking Power". Among his best lifts in his early years were a 400 kg squat, 260 kg bench press and a 412.5 kg deadlift. In an interview in 1997, he claimed his most notable feat of strength was deadlifting 400 kg for 3 repetitions.

Personal records
Bench Press – 
Squat – 
Squat –  x 14 reps (2002 WSM Final)
Deadlift – 
Raw Deadlift –  for 3 repetitions
 Farmer's walk –  in each hand (70 meter course) in 22.87 seconds (2003 Finland Grand Prix)

Retirement
Karlsen retired from competition in 2006, and began serving as presenter and producer of the Norwegian version of the World's Strongest Man contest and the qualifying tour; Giants Live

After retirement
Karlsen is the event organizer for the Norway's Strongest Man competition, introducing events and commentating. Karlsen was a co-commentator for the final event at the 2010 Arnold Strongman Classic. Karlsen also ran the Viking Power Challenge event in Norway, which was a part of the Super Series and later Giants Live tour for qualification into the World's Strongest Man competition.

Other competitions
Strongest Man in the North 1996  	-	5
World Series Strongman Challenge 1997 	-	3
European Hercules 1997 	 	        -       4
Helsinki Grand Prix 1998 	 	-       2
Atlantic Giant 1998 	 	        -	3
Helsinki Grand Prix 2000 	 	-	3
Ireland Grand Prix 2000 	 		-       3
Beauty & The Beast 2000 	 		-       2
Prague Grand Prix 2000 		 	-	2
Romania Grand Prix 2000 	 		-       4
China Grand Prix 2000 	 		-	4
Northeast Strongman Showdown 2001 	- 	1
Polish Grand Prix 2001 	 		-	3
Europe's Strongest Man 2001 		- 	1
Dutch Grand Prix 2001 			-	3
Beauty & The Beast 2001 	 		-       3
World Muscle Power 2001 	 		-       2
Prague Grand Prix 2001 	 		-	2
World Record Breakers 2001 	 	-	1
X-treme Strongman Challenge 2001 	-	1
Stockholm Grand Prix 	 		-	3
Northeast Strongman Showdown 2002 	-	2
Arnold Classic strongman Contest 2002 	- 	2
Vantaa Challenge 2002 	 		-	2
Atlantic Giants 2002 	 		-	1
Clash of Titans 2002 	 		-	1
Clash of the Celtic giants 2002 	 	-       2
Europe Strongest Man 2002 		- 	3
China Grand Prix 2002 			-	1
Sweden Grand Prix Super Series 2002 	- 	2
Team World vs. Poland 2002 	 	-	1
Super Series Final 2002 	 		-       2
Hawaii Grand Prix Super Series 	 	-	9
Arnold Classic Strongman contest 2003 	- 	2
Helsinki Grand Prix 2003 		- 	6
World Muscle & Power 2003 		- 	6
Holland Grand Prix Super Series 2003 	- 	5
Europe Strongest Man 2003 		- 	6
Canada Grand Prix Super Series 2003 	- 	3
World Team Championship 2003 	 	-	5
Finland Grand Prix Super Series 2003 	- 	4
World Record Breaker 2003 	 	-	5
Norway Strongest Man 2003 	 	-	1
MHP X-TREME STRONGMAN Championship 2003 	-       2
Norway Strongest Man 2006			-       1

References

External links
Official web site

Norwegian bodybuilders
Norwegian powerlifters
Norwegian strength athletes
1967 births
Living people
Sportspeople from Drammen
Male powerlifters
20th-century Norwegian people
21st-century Norwegian people